Retimohnia caelata, common name : the plump whelk, is a species of sea snail, a marine gastropod mollusk in the family Retimohniidae, the true whelks and the like.

Description
The shell size varies between 10 mm and 27 mm

Distribution
This speciesoccurs in European waters (Iceland) and in the Northwest Atlantic Ocean (from Massachusetts to North Carolina)

References

 Gofas, S.; Le Renard, J.; Bouchet, P. (2001). Mollusca, in: Costello, M.J. et al. (Ed.) (2001). European register of marine species: a check-list of the marine species in Europe and a bibliography of guides to their identification. Collection Patrimoines Naturels, 50: pp. 180–213
 Abbott, R.T. (1974). American Seashells. 2nd ed. Van Nostrand Reinhold: New York, NY (USA). 663 pp

Retimohniidae
Gastropods described in 1880
Taxa named by Sidney Irving Smith